Ooblets (previously known as Moblets) is a life simulation video game developed and published by Glumberland. It was released via early access on July 15, 2020, for Windows and Xbox One. Its Windows release is exclusive to the Epic Games Store. The game launched on September 1, 2022 for Windows, Xbox One, and Nintendo Switch.

Gameplay
The game combines the farming elements of Story of Seasons with the creature collecting and battling mechanics of Pokémon.

The player arrives in Badgetown, a seaside town in Oob, where they are greeted by Mayor Tinstle and given a basic starting farm. In Badgetown there are several shops including Meed's Seeds, Kibbonbon, Manatweee and Cuddlecups Cafe. Players can purchase furniture and decor for their house, as well as seeds to grow on their farm. There are different quests that can be performed to unlock new shops and buildings, as well as improve the player's friendship level with the other residents. Players can also join one four clubs including Frunbuns, Peaksnubs, Mossprouts and Mimpuns.

Ooblets, little creatures that the player befriends, can be grown from seed and used to perform tasks, like farming and machine operating, or dance-battle with other Ooblets. Unlike other life simulation games such as Stardew Valley, Ooblets replaces combat with a card-based dance-off system allowing new Ooblet seeds to be won and Ooblets to be levelled up.

Updates 
Ooblets has received frequent updates to fix bugs and introduce new features and locations. On June 12, 2021, the Port Forward update was released bringing a new region and new Ooblets. As of July 2021, there are six locations in the game: Badgetown, Wildlands, Mamoonia, Nullwhere, Port Forward, and Pantsabear Hill.

Development 
Ooblets was developed by a two-person indie game development studio composed of artist/programmer Rebecca Cordingley and designer Ben Wasser, since 2016.

Controversy 
The game was due to be published by Double Fine, but following that company's acquisition by Microsoft in June 2019, the Ooblets developers announced that they would instead self-publish the title. On August 1, 2019, it was announced that Ooblets would be an Epic Games Store exclusive. In the announcement by Glumberland's Ben Wasser, he included joking language related to criticisms of the Epic Games Store, calling those who threatened to pirate Epic Games Store exclusives "immature, toxic gamers," but that the situation was "nothing to get worked up about." The announcement led to massive backlash, including individuals sending threatening and abusive messages to the developers. The harassment also included out-of-context or fake posts by Wasser, including a fabricated post of Wasser claiming that "gamers should be in gas chambers." Wasser later compiled his thoughts on the matter in a Medium post in August 2019, apologizing for acting in a hostile manner. Several fans who were shown in the screenshot conversations being spread clarified that they held no contempt towards Wasser, but noted that his responses on Discord were poorly worded.

Reception

The game received mixed to positive reviews from critics.

Further reading

References

External links 
 

Indie video games
Life simulation games
Nintendo Switch games
Xbox One games
Xbox Play Anywhere games
Windows games
Farming video games
2022 video games